Xino Nero (before 1926: Εξή Σού - Exi Sou; ; or alternatively Gorno Varbeni Macedonian: Горно Врбени; Bulgarian: Горно Върбени). The old name of the village is Gorno Varbeni, to distinguish it from the other Florina village of Varbeni, now known as Itea, Florina.) 

It is a village in the municipality Amyntaiou, within the prefecture of Florina. The village is built at a height of 550 meters and is one of the main villages of the Prefecture of Florina. According to the 2011 census, the population of the village amounts to 1081 inhabitants. The main occupation of the inhabitants is agriculture and animal husbandry. It is 34 km from Florina and 5 from Amyntaio.

Geography
Xino Nero is in Greece. It is located in the municipality of Amyntaio, prefecture of Florina and region of West Macedonia, in the northern part of the country, 300 km northwest of Athens the country's capital. 647 meters above sea level is located in Xinó Neró, and has 1,081 inhabitants.

The land around Xinó Neró is hilly to the northwest, but to the southeast it is flat.  The highest point in the area has an elevation of 920 meters and is 1.8 km northwest of Xinó Neró. [ citation needed ] There are about 32 people per square kilometer around Xinó Neró relatively small population. The nearest larger town is Amýntaio, 4.8 km east of Xinó Neró. The countryside around Xinó Neró is almost completely covered.

The climate is humid and subtropical. The average temperature is 14 °C . The warmest month is July, at 26 °C, and the coldest December, at 0 °C. The average rainfall is 1,000 millimeters per year. The wettest month is February, with 123 millimeters of rain, and the wettest August, with 32 millimeters.

History
The village had been in the Ottoman Empire up to the start of the 20th century. It was ruled by Bulgaria after the First Balkan War, and became part of Greece after the Second Balkan War. During the First World War in August 1916 the village was briefly occupied by the First Army (Bulgaria). During the battles the church of the village was destroyed. After the Treaty of Neuilly, the village was returned to Greece

Demographics
Xino Nero had 1393 inhabitants in 1981. In fieldwork done by Riki Van Boeschoten in late 1993, Xino Nero was populated by Slavophones. The Macedonian language was used by people of all ages, both in public and private settings, and as the main language for interpersonal relationships. Some elderly villagers had little knowledge of Greek.

Culture

Sights
At the top of Radosi there is a landscaped recreation area. In the village there are 4 churches of St. Georgiou, St. Athanasiou, St. Nikolaou and St. Barbara. The building of the Primary School is one of the most important buildings in the area and adorns the village square, it was built before 1880 and has been declared a protected area. In the village, the dialects of the Eastern South Slavic languages were introduced after the middle of the 19th century, a fact that made it the target of the Bulgarian claims.  During these years the school was built with the assistance of the villagers and craftsmen from Pelagonia . It was designed by the French. Formerly there was the watermill of the village, which was destroyed over time.

Mineral Water
The Greek name of the village translates as 'Sour Water'. Natural mineral water is currently bottled and traded by the "Pure Municipal Enterprise and Industrial Sour Water", which is also responsible for the production of bottling while of course it sells soft drinks, with pan-Hellenic recognition. It is the most famous local product of the prefecture of Florina. Scientific research has exacerbated the healing effect of this water, mainly on the kidneys but also on the liver of humans. The water from the Sour Water sources is bottled in the automatic bottling plant that has been operating since 1958.. They belong to the category of cold hydrocarbon sources. This pleasant acidic property and the presence in normal proportions of calcium and magnesium salts classify them in the category of very important mineral waters. The purity and uniqueness of their taste is due to the natural enrichment of the sources with free carbon dioxide.

Carnival
The factor that makes Xino Nero famous all over Greece, is the carnival events that take place every year at the end of February and the beginning of March. These events are known for the fun, the dance, the originality but also the liveliness of those who take part every year on a non-profit basis. These events start on Swan Thursday where there is a mask dance with an orchestra and traditional music. Officially, however, they start next Thursday with a dance in the village square and a competition for the best costume at the group level. The same happens on Friday and Saturday while on Sunday at noon the parade of chariots and hikers is held that many times the members of each group are over twenty!

References

Folk museums in Western Macedonia
Populated places in Florina (regional unit)